, son of regent Sukezane, was a kugyō or Japanese court noble of the Edo period (1603–1868). His consort was a daughter of fourth head of Hiroshima Domain Asano Tsunanaga; Morotaka and she adopted his biological younger brother Yukinori as their son.

References
 

1688 births
1713 deaths
Fujiwara clan
Kujō family